The 2020–21 season is Bristol City Football Club's 123rd season in existence and sixth consecutive season in the Championship. They also competed in the FA Cup and competed in the EFL Cup.

Squad

Statistics

|-
!colspan=14|Players out on loan:

|-
!colspan=14|Players that left the club:

|}

Goals record

Disciplinary record

Transfers

Transfers in

Loans in

Loans out

Transfers out

Pre-season and friendlies

Bristol City F.C. confirmed on the 13th August 2020  that they would play at least 2 Friendlies in the Delayed Pre-season in 2020, both behind closed doors both at Ashton Gate Stadium, against Cheltenham Town and Portsmouth.The latter cancelled the friendly after agreeing to move their Carabao cup fixture forward a week. Swindon, Weston-Super-Mare & 2 60 Min games against Villa were booked

Competitions

Overview

EFL Championship

League table

Results summary

Results by matchday

Matches
The 2020–21 season fixtures were released on 21 August.

FA Cup

The third round draw was made on 30th November, with Premier League and EFL Championship clubs all entering the competition. The draw for the fourth and fifth round were made on 11 January, conducted by Peter Crouch.

EFL Cup

The first round draw was made on 18 August, live on Sky Sports, by Paul Merson. The draw for both the second and third round were confirmed on September 6, live on Sky Sports by Phil Babb.

Notes

References

External links

Bristol City F.C. seasons
Bristol City F.C.